Bryan Giovanni Róchez Mejía (born 1 January 1995) is a Honduran professional footballer who plays as a forward for Primeira Liga club Portimonense and the Honduras national football team.

Club career

Real España
Born in Tegucigalpa and raised in Tornabé, Róchez joined Real C.D. España at a young age. After progressing through Real España's youth system, he made his senior debut in 2012. His first Liga Nacional appearance for the club came on 13 October 2012, in a 1–1 draw at home against Deportes Savio in the Apertura tournament; He played as a starter and was replaced by Allan Lalín in the 53rd minute. He scored his first goal on 24 March 2013, the equalizer in a 1–1 draw against Marathón in the Sampedran Derby. By the end of the 2013–14 season, Róchez had scored 20 goals for Real España to finish as the second highest goalscorer in the league, a campaign that saw Real España crowned as the Apertura champions.

Orlando City
On 15 December 2014, Major League Soccer expansion side Orlando City SC announced the signing of Róchez as a Designated Player, making him one of the youngest Designated Players in MLS history at only 19 years old. He made his MLS debut on 8 March 2015, a 1–1 home draw against fellow newcomers New York City FC. He entered as a second-half substitute in the 80th minute in place of Lewis Neal. Róchez scored his first goal for The Lions on the following 13 September, in a 3–1 win against Sporting Kansas City.

He was loaned to Orlando City B in March 2016. He made his debut on 26 March in Orlando's opening game against Wilmington Hammerheads in the United Soccer League. He came on as a second-half substitute for Richie Laryea, playing 20 minutes in a 2–1 loss. He scored his first goal on 26 April in a 2–1 loss against Harrisburg City Islanders.

Loan return to Real España
On 22 July 2016, Róchez returned to Real España on loan after having not made a single appearance for Orlando City during the season. He played his first game on 10 August in a 1–0 loss against Olimpia in the league. 18 days later, he scored his first goal since his return as Real España defeated Honduras Progreso 4–1.

Atlanta United
On 17 March 2017, Róchez was waived by Orlando City. However, Róchez was quickly claimed by new expansion side Atlanta United FC.

Nacional
On 22 August 2017, Róchez left Atlanta United and joined Portuguese LigaPro club C.D. Nacional. He made his debut the following 24 September in a 3–1 away victory against Condeixa in the second round of the Taça de Portugal. He made his league debut on 1 October in the 5–4 away defeat to Braga B, he also scored his first goal and Nacional's third. On 29 December 2021, Róchez scored a hat-trick in Nacional's 4–1 home win against Académico de Viseu, in the process becoming the top scorer in the history of the club.

Portimonense
On 13 July 2022, Primeira Liga club Portimonense S.C. presented the signing of Róchez in a press conference.

International career
Róchez made his senior national team debut for Honduras on 17 November 2014 in a friendly against China, starting in a 0–0 draw.

In April 2015, he was called up to represent Honduras in the 2015 FIFA U-20 World Cup in New Zealand. On 1 June, he scored a brace in the first group stage match of the tournament against Uzbekistan in an eventual 4–3 win. He would feature in all three group stage matches as Honduras were eliminated in the first round.

Career statistics

Honours

Real España
 Liga Nacional de Fútbol Profesional de Honduras: 2013 Apertura

Nacional
 LigaPro: 2017–18

References

External links

1995 births
Living people
Sportspeople from Tegucigalpa
Honduran footballers
Association football forwards
Real C.D. España players
Orlando City SC players
Orlando City B players
C.D. Nacional players
Portimonense S.C. players
Honduras international footballers
2014 Copa Centroamericana players
Designated Players (MLS)
Liga Nacional de Fútbol Profesional de Honduras players
Major League Soccer players
USL Championship players
Liga Portugal 2 players
Primeira Liga players
2015 CONCACAF U-20 Championship players
Honduran expatriate footballers
Expatriate soccer players in the United States
Expatriate footballers in Portugal
Honduran expatriate sportspeople in the United States
Honduran expatriate sportspeople in Portugal
Central American Games gold medalists for Honduras
Central American Games medalists in football